Dedovo is a rural locality (a selo) and the administrative centre of Dedovsky Selsoviet, Fyodorovsky District, Bashkortostan, Russia. The population was 328 as of 2010. There are 6 streets.

Geography 
Dedovo is located 16 km southwest of Fyodorovka (the district's administrative centre) by road. Novaya Derevnya is the nearest rural locality.

References 

Rural localities in Fyodorovsky District